Baron Thomas Jules Vinçotte (1850–1925) was a Belgian sculptor and medallist.

Life 

Vinçotte was the son of Jean-Marie Vinçotte, born in Borgerhout and brother of the engineer Robert Vinçotte.  Thomas initially trained at the Académie Royale des Beaux-Arts in Brussels under Joseph Jacquet and Eugène Simonis, then continued his education in Paris at the École des Beaux-Arts under Pierre-Jules Cavelier. He returned to Belgium and from 1886 through 1921 he lectured at the National University of Fine Arts in Antwerp.

Vinçotte developed strong social and political ties with the court of King Leopold II, as evidenced by his baronial title, his many commissions for large government projects, multiple equestrian statues of the king, portrait busts of the royal family and important officials, and his designs for Belgian coinage circa 1905.

A street in Schaerbeek is named in his honor.

Honours 
 1881: Knight in the Order of Leopold.
 1887: Officer in the Order of Leopold.
 1896: Commander in the Order of Leopold.

Work 
 Allegory of Truth, a marble monument to sculptor G. L. Godecharle, Brussels Park, 1881
 Le dompteur de chevaux ("Horse Tamer"), Avenue Louise/Louizalaan, Brussels, 1885
 Bronze monument to François Anneessens, Place Anneessens/Anneessensplein, Brussels, 1889
 Bronze monument to Jan Palfijn, Schouwburgplein, Kortrijk, 1889
 Pediment sculpture showing Belgium flanked by allegorical groups representing Industry and Agriculture, Royal Palace of Brussels, 
 Bronze bust of Georges Montefiore-Levi, University of Liège, 1904
 The quadriga entitled Brabant Raising the National Flag or Quadriga of Brabant, atop the triumphal arch at the Parc du Cinquantenaire/Jubelpark, Brussels, with fellow sculptor Jules Lagae, 1904–1905
 Multifigure monument to the Belgian inventor Zénobe Gramme, Liège, 1905
 Two bronze figures of Fame with chariots, atop the Royal Museum of Fine Arts, Antwerp, installed 1905
 Monument to the Belgian Pioneers in Congo, at the Parc du Cinquantenaire, Brussels, 1921
 Equestrian Statue of Leopold II, /, Brussels, 1926
 Bronze group of Seahorses and Tritons, for the park of the Royal Castle of Ardenne (transferred to Laeken Park in Brussels)

References

External links
 

1850 births
1925 deaths
Belgian architectural sculptors
People from Borgerhout
20th-century Belgian sculptors
19th-century Belgian sculptors
19th-century Belgian male artists
Académie Royale des Beaux-Arts alumni
20th-century Belgian male artists